There are no pan-European polls for the European elections. However, several organizations calculate the theoretical seat distribution in the European Parliament in advance to the EP election based on national polls in all member states. The table below displays these different projections. The projections prior to 31 January 2020 still include the United Kingdom, which left the EU on that date.

Seats
The following table shows the projected number of seats for the groups in the European Parliament.

Popular vote
The chart below depicts opinion polls conducted for the 2024 European Parliament election using a six-poll moving average. From 31 January 2020, the United Kingdom is not included.

The following table shows the projected popular vote share for the groups in the EU Parliament aggregated on the European level. EU27 excludes the United Kingdom in this context. EU28 includes the United Kingdom.

National opinion polling

Germany

Hungary

References

European
2024 European Parliament election